The Gambler Smurfs (original French name Les Schtroumpfs Jouers) is the twenty-third album of the Smurfs comic series.

Summary

Three Smurfs are getting flour from a human village, trying to not be seen. They watch a joust and two noblemen who bet on the result.

Upon their return to the Smurf Village, the three Smurfs begin betting on who can hit a signal with a stone, and later they bet some food on the results of throwing dice. One of them (revealed to be the Lucky Smurf) has a good start, but soon begins to lose. Other Smurfs watch them and get interested in gambling too, like one who bets a ladder borrowed by Handy Smurf.

Brainy Smurf tries to stop the gambling, but then gets tempted and ends up losing everything save for his hat and a barrel to cover himself. Papa Smurf sees him, a Smurf with his glasses and Vanity Smurf's mirror, and Farmer Smurf with Harmony Smurf's trumpet.

The gambling frenzy catches the whole village. One morning, Miner Smurf goes to play dice just to find that the other Smurfs are now betting on snail races, but they are so slow that the race finishes at night.

Lumberjack Smurf continues his normal routine, thinking gambling is a waste of time, while the other Smurfs find any excuse to gamble. Hefty Smurf wins all of the Brainy Smurf's books, while Smurfette wins all of the Greedy Smurf's cakes.

One morning, Papa Smurf finds that a Smurf has lost his house gambling, and after finding out how gambling has affected the Smurfs' lives, bans it.

Some days later, Lumberjack Smurf finds that some humans are cutting the forest. Meanwhile, Papa Smurf finds a clandestine casino in the Village, and all the Smurfs inside. Then, the Lumberjack Smurf arrives to tell about the humans.

The Smurfs find that the humans plan to build a gambling paradise, and its placing puts the Smurf Village under direct threat, because it's the place for the hyppodrome. We also find that the Lucky Smurf had bet with another Smurf that Lumberjack Smurf would be wrong, and now Lucky Smurf owes him three nuts.

Again, a Smurf bets to Lucky Smurf that Papa Smurf will find what to do. Lucky Smurf accepts, and obviously loses since Papa Smurf knows what to do: ask help to Gargamel, because his house is also threatened.

Gargamel must challenge the other humans to avert the construction of the gambling paradise, so Gargamel is trained by the Hefty Smurf. Gargamel faces a training mannequin... and loses. Lucky Smurf bets on how many times Gargamel will resist on his second round against the mannequin... and Lucky Smurf loses, too.

Despite failing in everything, Gargamel goes to present his challenge anyway. If he wins, the forest is left alone. If he loses, he will become a jester for three years.

The challenge is a joust, but the Smurfs steal all the weapons, so Gargamel suggests his opponents declare themselves losers. Instead, they decide to create unorthodox competitions, like pig-riding races. Lucky Smurf bets that Gargamel will lose, this time sure he will win the bet, but the opposing knight trips and Gargamel wins the first event. the second event is a pillow fight, but Gargamel's opponent can't bear the pillow's weight and falls.

Lucky Smurf, desperate to win his bet, sabotages Gargamel, but he's found by Papa Smurf, who reminds him that if Gargamel loses, it will be the end of the village.

There is a tie, and the last event is playing dice. Gargamel gets a seven and wins, so the forest is left alone. Gargamel bids farewell to the Smurfs, but then he decides to catch them. Gargamel catches the Lucky Smurf, but then Lucky Smurf tells Gargamel that he's incapable to get another seven or an eleven. Gargamel accepts the bet, but he doesn't get the number, and while he tries again, Lucky Smurf escapes, having technically won a bet at last, and returns to the Smurf Village along with the other Smurfs.

Notes

 This is the only time the Lumberjack Smurf appears with a different hat and a jacket. in previous and later comics he wears a normal Smurf outfit.
 Gargamel references The Reporter Smurf
 When training Gargamel, Hefty Smurf wears a knight armor, just like he had previously done in a Hanna-Barbera series episode and would later do in the game The Smurfs & Co.

The Smurfs books